The BMW 2 Series Active Tourer (F45/U06 model code) is a two-row subcompact executive MPV produced by BMW since August 2014. The closely related BMW 2 Series Gran Tourer (F46 model code) is a longer three-row version which began production in 2015. Marketed as part of the 2 Series range, the F45/F46 are based on the front-wheel-drive UKL2 platform. The design is based on the BMW Concept Active Tourer, and is mechanically related to the Mini Countryman, also built by BMW.

The F45/F46 are the first front-wheel drive vehicles sold under the BMW marque, designed to compete directly with the Mercedes-Benz B-Class. Sales commenced in November 2014. An all-wheel-drive xDrive system is offered as an option.

Pre-production concepts

BMW Concept Active Tourer (2012)
BMW Active Tourer is a plug in hybrid concept vehicle with 1.5 litre turbo three cylinder petrol engine derived from BMW six cylinder engines and a synchronous electric motor, lithium-ion battery, High Reflection Silver body colour, front tilted BMW radiator grille, twin headlines with LED positioning lights (eyebrows) stretching far back into the side panels, multi faceted front apron, integrated door openers, contrasted side sills with rising shadow line, twenty inch wheels.

It also features rear light clusters running well into the side panel, a panorama sunroof with electronically adjustable brightness, 40:20:40 split rear backrests, centrally located vertical metal track is integrated in the back of the front seats, multifunction instrument display with 10.25 inch integrated screen, multicolour Head Up Display with brightness automatically adapts to the light available, navigation system with an eight-inch display, ECO PRO mode with coasting mode.

The vehicle was unveiled in the 2012 Paris Motor Show, followed by the 83rd Geneva International Motor Show in 2013, and the Auto Shanghai 2013.

BMW Concept Active Tourer Outdoor (2013)
It is a version of BMW Concept Active Tourer with transversely mounted 1.5 litre petrol engine with front wheel drive, plug in hybrid with electric motor, Gold Race Orange body colour, MoonWhite and MoonRock Grey interior leather upholstery, a carrier system for two bicycles (integrated into the interior).

The vehicle was unveiled in 2013 OutDoor in Friedrichshafen, followed by the 2013 Frankfurt Auto Show, followed by the 2013 Tokyo Motor Show.

First generation (F45/F46; 2014)

BMW 2 Series Active Tourer (F45) 
The vehicle was unveiled in the 84th Geneva International Motor Show 2014, followed by the 2014 Canadian International Auto Show, 13th Beijing International Automotive Exhibition 2014, and 22nd Auto Mobil International Leipzig 2014.The 2 Series Active Tourer was supposed to be called the BMW 1 Series Gran Turismo before it was launched. 

Early models included 218i, 225i, 218d (150PS). 220d (190PS) was set to arrive in September 2014, followed by 220i (192PS) in November 2014.

Early models for the United Kingdom included 218i (100 kW), 218d (120 kW). From November 2014, M Sport specification (including 18 inch M Sport alloy wheels, Dakota leather upholstery, High gloss Shadowline exterior trim, Aluminium hexagon interior trim, M Sport aerodynamic styling, M Sport suspension and M Sport interior styling enhancements) becomes available.

BMW 2 Series Active Tourer M Sport Package includes exclusive Estoril Blue body colour, M Aerodynamics package, M Sport suspension, 17 or 18-inch M light alloy wheels, M leather steering wheel. The 225i Active Tourer with M Sport Package was unveiled in the 2014 Geneva Motor Show.
Production at the BMW Brilliance plant in Shenyang, China started in Q1 of 2016, with the first sales recorded in March.

BMW 2 Series Gran Tourer (F46) 
The 2 Series Gran Tourer is a long wheelbase, three-row version, which was released in June 2015. It is the first and the only three-row MPV ever produced by BMW. A two-row version is also offered as the base option for some models. At launch, the vehicle was offered with Advantage, Sport Line, Luxury Line and M Sport trim levels in Europe.

Engines

Second generation (U06; 2021) 

The second-generation BMW 2 Series Active Tourer was unveiled in October 2021. Available with a choice of petrol and diesel engines, there will be a range of PHEV powertrains available from 2022 onwards.

Engines

References

External links

 Official website

2 Series Active Tourer
Cars introduced in 2014
2020s cars
Compact MPVs
Front-wheel-drive vehicles
All-wheel-drive vehicles
Partial zero-emissions vehicles
Plug-in hybrid vehicles